Johann Adolf Rettelbusch (15 December 1858, Kammerforst – 8 January 1934, Magdeburg) was a German painter. He was nicknamed the Brockenmaler, after Brocken, a peak in the Harz mountains, which became a major focus of his work after he took a trip there in 1888.

Life 
Rettelbusch was the eighth child born to a family of innkeepers. After attending the local schools, he went to the Weimar Saxon-Grand Ducal Art School in 1878. Theodor Hagen and Alexander Struys were among his teachers. After trying several styles, he decided to devote himself to landscape painting. Before graduating, however, he had to quit school for financial reasons. In 1880 and 1881, he took lessons to pass the drawing teacher exams with Karl Gussow at the Prussian Academy of Arts.

Despite this, he remained unemployed. Returning to Kammerforst, he supported himself with an occasional odd job. In 1883, he was able to study at the Museum of Decorative Arts in Berlin, thanks to a generous stipend from Max Friedrich Koch and Ernst Ewald. He acquired skills in landscape, portrait, and decorative painting, receiving several awards.

In 1886 and 1887, he took a study trip to Italy. The drawings and watercolors he made there led to a job offer from the Prussian Ministry of Trade and Industry, teaching decorative painting at the new arts and crafts school in Magdeburg. He began work in 1887 and later became vice-rector under the engineer . By 1892, he was Acting Manager of the school. In 1906, he was appointed a Professor and remained there until his retirement in 1924.

He was also involved in the cultural life of Magdeburg. In 1893, he founded the Artists' Association of St. Luke and was its president for many years. Nine years later, he founded the Artists' Association of Börde (a region in Northern Germany). He was an active member of the Masonic Lodge. A street in Magdeburg is named after him.

Work 
Although he is primarily known as a landscape painter, his over 4,000 canvases dealt in a wide variety of subjects, including the First World War and the Krupp-Gruson armaments factory. Every year, he produced a series of Brocken-related postcards. Hundreds of his works are in private collections, and many were destroyed in World War II, but a large selection may be seen at the Magdeburg Cultural History Museum and the Rennstieg-Hotel in Kammerforst, which is still operated by the Rettelbusch family.

References

Further reading 
Gerd Kley: Adolf Rettelbusch. In the Magdeburger Biographisches Lexikon. Magdeburg 2002, .
Gerd Kley: Vom Hainich zum Brocken – Stationen im Leben des Magdeburger Malers Professor Adolf Rettelbusch (1858–1934). Bad Langensalza 2010, .
Gerd Kley: "Der Maler Adolf Rettelbusch und seine Bilder aus dem Werratal", in: Eichsfeld-Jahrbuch 2022, S. 259-279, Duderstadt, November 2022

External links 

 
 Wernigerode-Tourismus: Vom Hainich zum Brocken, book review, with three paintings.

1858 births
1934 deaths
People from Unstrut-Hainich-Kreis
People from the Province of Saxony
German landscape painters
19th-century German painters
German male painters
20th-century German painters
20th-century German male artists
Prussian Academy of Arts alumni
19th-century German male artists